Ruckland is a village in the civil parish of Maidenwell, and about  south from the town of Louth, Lincolnshire, England. It lies in the Lincolnshire Wolds, a designated Area of Outstanding Natural Beauty.

In the 1086 Domesday Book Ruckland is written as "Rochland", with nine households, the Lord of the Manor being Briscard. The population of the village is included in the civil parish of Burwell, Lincolnshire.

Ruckland's church, dedicated to Saint Olave (sometimes Olaf), seats forty people. It was built in 1885 of green sandstone by William Scorer, and is a Grade II listed building.
The churchyard contains the war graves of a Royal Navy sailor and an Army Veterinary Corps soldier of the Second World War.

George Hall (1863–1918) was rector of Ruckland and a member of the Gypsy Lore Society. In 1915 he published his book, The Gypsy's Parson - His Experiences and Adventures.

References

External links

Villages in Lincolnshire
East Lindsey District